Curt Ragnar Benckert (8 August 1887 – 28 November 1950) was a Swedish tennis player. He competed in singles and doubles at the 1912 Summer Olympics and finished fifth in two doubles events.

References

External links
 

1887 births
1950 deaths
Swedish male tennis players
Olympic tennis players of Sweden
Tennis players at the 1912 Summer Olympics
People from Sundsvall
Sportspeople from Västernorrland County
20th-century Swedish people